The 1906 Purdue Boilermakers football team was an American football team that represented Purdue University during the 1906 college football season. In their first season under head coach Myron E. Witham, the Boilermakers compiled an 0–5 record, finished in last place in the Big Nine Conference with an 0–3 record against conference opponents, and were outscored by their opponents by a total of 86 to 5. W. A. Wellinghoff was the team captain.

Schedule

References

Purdue
Purdue Boilermakers football seasons
Purdue Boilermakers football
College football winless seasons